Yulia Sachkov (born 28 December 1998), is an Israeli kickboxer.  She is the 2019 World Kickboxing Champion in the under-48 kilogram (114.5 pound) weight class of K-1 style kickboxing.

Biography
Sachkov was born in Haifa, Israel, and is Jewish. She serves in the Israel Defense Forces as an outstanding athlete.

She is the 2016 World Cup Junior Kickboxing Champion, the 2017 European Junior Kicking Champion, the 2018 World Association of Kickboxing Organizations (WAKO) Senior World Kickboxing Champion, winner of the 2018 WAKO Croatia Kickboxing Open Gold Medal, winner of the 2018 WAKO Bestfighter in the World Cup Championship, winner of the Absolute Champion in the K-1 and KL European Cup, and winner of the 2019 WAKO Austria World Cup. 

Sachkov  was awarded the Israeli Young Athlete of the Year Award by Israeli Minister of Culture and Sport Miri Regev in 2017.

She lost a preliminary match at Bellator 209 to Viktoria Makarova by TKO (punches) in the first round.

Sachkov is the 2019 World Kickboxing Champion, having won the gold medal in Sarajevo in Bosnia in the under-52 kilogram (114.5 pound) weight class of K-1 style kickboxing at 21 years of age.

See also
List of select Jewish mixed martial artists

References

External links
 
 
 
 

1999 births
People from Haifa
Living people
Israeli female kickboxers
Israeli Muay Thai practitioners
Female Muay Thai practitioners
Female kickboxers
Jewish martial artists